The Women's sprint at the 2014 UCI Track Cycling World Championships was held on 28 February and 1 March 2014. 25 cyclists participated in the contest.

Medalists

Results

Qualifying
The qualifying was held at 12:00.

1/16 finals
The 1/16 finals were held at 13:00.

1/8 finals
The 1/8 finals were held at 14:20.

1/8 finals repechage
The 1/8 finals repechages were held at 15:30.

Quarterfinals
Race 1 was held at 19:20 and Race 2 at 20:00.

Race for 5th–8th places
The race for 5th–8th places was held at 21:50.

Semifinals
Race 1 was held at 18:30 and Race 2 at 18:55.

Finals
Race 1 was held at 20:30, Race 2 at 20:55.

References

2014 UCI Track Cycling World Championships
UCI Track Cycling World Championships – Women's sprint